= Tashkent Economics College =

College in Uzbekistan since 1998

Coordinates: 41°22′29.2″N 69°19′1.9″E

- Toshkent Iqtisodiyot Kolleji
- Type: Public
- Rector: Yarashev Ochil Turaevich
- Location: Tashkent, Uzbekistan
- Website: tiqk.uz/uz

Tashkent Economics College was first established in 1998 on 24 February by the 77th edict of "Cabinet of Ministers" of Republic Uzbekistan, which was about "Creating and establishing colleges and academic lyceums". It was the first step on creation of new college. In 1998 May 18 there was another edict with number 204, and again in 1998 May 27 there was the next edict number 147 of the "Cabinet of Ministers" of Uzbekistan about creation of new college. After this edict college was opened officially under the name of "Tashkent Economics Professional College". In 2003 "Cabinet of Ministers" of Uzbekistan made the edict number 473 on 29 October which said to change the name of college to "Tashkent Economics College".

Nowadays the main building of the college if located in Tashkent city, Yunusabad district, block 19, house 37. The main building of the "Tashkent Economics College" was reconstructed in the years 2008 and 2009. From the year 2010 it continued fully functioning. There are 33 classes, 3 lab rooms and 2 computer classes in the main building of the college. There is canteen which can serve 60 students at one time. There are three faculties at the college, which are: "Finance and Economics Faculty", "Banking" and "Accountanting and Economics faculty".

== Links ==
- Article
- Information
